The Word In Praise is a radio format programmed and produced in the US by Salem Radio Networks. It targets the 35- to 54-year-old Christian listener demographic. This radio format has a blend of soft Christian contemporary music from artists such as Amy Grant, Steven Curtis Chapman, MercyMe, Michael W. Smith and Rebecca St. James. The Word In Praise has become a main staple of churches, mainly for worship anthems.

It is also used on teaching and talk radio stations.

External links
SRN Music

 
 

American radio networks
Radio formats
Contemporary Christian music
Salem Media Group properties